CITIC Guoan Information Industry Co., Ltd.  is a Chinese publicly traded company in the computer network infrastructure and information service industries. It includes the construction and operation of cable television networks and satellite information networks, the network system integration, software development and value-added telecommunications services. It was founded in 1997 by its parent company, state-owned enterprise CITIC Guoan Group (now mostly owned by private capitals). It was listed on the Shenzhen Stock Exchange at the same year.

CITIC Guoan Information Industry is a constituent of SZSE 100 Index (blue chip of Shenzhen Stock Exchange) and pan-China index CSI 300 Index (top 300 companies of the two exchanges of the mainland China), as well as its sub-index CSI 200 Index (101st to 300th companies of the two exchanges of the mainland China).

References

External links
 

Companies listed on the Shenzhen Stock Exchange
Government-owned companies of China
Companies based in Beijing
Chinese companies established in 1997
Networking companies
CITIC Group
Privatization in China